Seal is the debut studio album by Seal, released in 1991. It contains the singles "Crazy", "Future Love Paradise", "The Beginning", "Killer" and "Violet". The album debuted at number one in the UK and went on to win Best British Album at the 1992 Brit Awards. Seal's following album, released in 1994, was also named Seal. It is usually referred to as Seal II.

There are two versions of the album, with minor and major differences in three songs. The shorter version of "Wild" is more rock-based and heavy than the original. The shorter version of "Violet" contains no dialogue within the singing. Track lengths of both versions are given for each song affected.
"Killer" is a re-recorded version of the UK number one single by Adamski, which also features Seal on vocals.

Many of the songs (including various ZTT mixes) were featured in the Greg Stump 1991 film Groove Requiem in the Key of Ski. Later Seal tracks appeared in other Stump films as well. The track "Killer" was also featured on the American crime series Homicide: Life on the Street and was included on the 2-disc soundtrack album.

Track listing
All lyrics and music written by Seal, except where noted.
 "The Beginning" (Seal, Guy Sigsworth) – 5:40
 "Deep Water" – 5:56
 "Crazy" (Seal, Sigsworth) – 4:47 or 5:57
 "Killer" (Adam Tinley, Seal) – 6:22
 "Whirlpool" – 3:56 or 3:51
 "Future Love Paradise" – 4:20
 "Wild" (Seal, Sigsworth) – 5:19 or 5:28
 "Show Me" – 5:59
 "Violet" (Seal, Sigsworth) – 8:06 or 8:31

Personnel
Seal – vocals
Richard Cottle, Mars Lasar, Mark Mancina, Jamie Muhoberac, Guy Sigsworth – keyboards/sampling
Gus Isidore, Randall Jacobs, Chester Kamen, Trevor Rabin, Kenji Suzuki, Bruce Woolley – guitars
Chrissy Shefts – all guitars ("Crazy") 
Trevor Horn, Steve Pearce, Doug Wimbish – bass guitar
Curt Bisquera, Denny Fongheiser, John Robinson, Keith LeBlanc – drums
Paulinho da Costa, Andy Duncan, Luís Jardim – percussion
Gary Maughan – Fairlight CMI
Gota Yashiki – drums, percussion, bass guitar 
Ian Morrow – keyboard and drum programming
Maria Vidal – backing vocals
Robin Hancock – programming
Anne Dudley – string arrangements
Richard Croft – cover photography

Charts

Weekly charts

Year-end charts

Certifications

References

Seal (musician) albums
1991 debut albums
Sire Records albums
Brit Award for British Album of the Year
Albums produced by Trevor Horn
ZTT Records albums
Warner Music Group albums